Bruno Destrée (1867-1919) was a Benedictine monk, a French-language poet, and a Belgian literary critic. He was the brother of the politician Jules Destrée.

Bruno Destrée was a monk at Maredsous Abbey and later at Keizersberg Abbey in Leuven. He was interested in the Pre-Raphaelite Brotherhood.

Biography 
Georges Destrée was born in Marcinelle August 10, 1867. He was the younger brother of the politician Jules Destrée.

Like his elder brother, he studied law at the Université Libre de Bruxelles. It was then he started putting his father's first name, Olivier, before his own. He collaborated as an art columnist in the magazine La Jeune Belgique, where he met Max Waller, Albert Giraud and Iwan Gilkin.

Anglophile, he was really enthusiastic about Pre-Raphaelite painting: in 1894 he published Les Préraphaélites : notes sur l’art décoratif et la peinture en Angleterre, the very first essay on this movement in French. In the Revue général of October 1895, he gave a nearly complete translation of "La Lampe de la mémoire", the sixth chapter of The Seven Lamps of Architecture; a few years later, Marcel Proust’s reading of that text would be decisive in his own business of translating John Ruskin’s work.

He then collaborated with the Catholic magazine Durendal. He gradually got closer to Catholicism and decided in October 1898 to enter the Order of St. Benedict. He took the name of Dom Bruno and later left Maredsous abbey to enter Keizersberg Abbey in Leuven. He was ordained priest in 1903.
 
In 1911, he collaborated with his brother to organise the exhibition Les Arts anciens du Hainaut.

He died of peritonitis on 30 October 1919 in Leuven.

Works 
 1891 – Journal des Destrée
 1894 – Poèmes sans rimes, available on Internet Archive
 1894 – Les Préraphaélites : notes sur l’art décoratif et la peinture en Angleterre, available on Internet Archive
 1895 – The Renaissance of Sculpture in Belgium, available on Internet Archive
 1897 – Les Mages
 1898 – Trois Poèmes : Sainte Dorothée de Cappadoce ; Sainte Rose de Viterbe ; Saint Jean Gualbert
 1904 – La Mère Jeanne de Saint-Mathieu Deleloë : une mystique inconnue du xviie siècle
 1908 – Au milieu du chemin de notre vie
 1910 – Les Bénédictins
 1911 – L'Âme du Nord
 1913 – Impressions et Souvenirs
 1913 – L’Orfèvrerie religieuse : l’œuvre de Jan Brom, available on Internet Archive

References 
 Cynthia J. Gamble, Proust as Interpreter of Ruskin : The Seven Lamps of Translation, Birmingham, Summa Publications, 2002, chap. 4 ("Proust’s Ruskinian epiphany"), pp. 52–55.

Bibliography 
  Laurence Brogniez, "Georges-Olivier Destrée et la religion de l’art : de l’esthète au converti", in Alain Dierkens (ed.), Problèmes d’histoire des religions : Dimensions du sacré dans les littératures profanes, vol. 10, Brussels, Éditions de l’université de Bruxelles, 1999, pp 33–42
 Henry Carton de Wiart, La Vocation d’Olivier-Georges Destrée, Paris, Flammarion, coll. "Notre clergé", 1931, 248 p.
 Geneviève De Grave, Dom Bruno Destrée : l’esthète, le converti, le moine, Liège, La Pensée catholique, coll. "Études religieuses", 1942, 22 p.
  René Dethier, Les Écrivains de chez nous : Dom Bruno Destrée (Olivier-Georges), vol. VI, Charleroi, Éditions de la Jeune Wallonie, s.d., 12 p.
 Arnold Goffin, "Olivier-Georges Destrée", Durendal, no. 12, 1898, pp. 991–1000.
 Pierre Nothomb, Une conversion esthétique : Olivier-Georges Destrée, Brussels, Action catholique, coll. " Science et foi ", 1913, 51 p.
  Gladys Turquet-Milnes, "The Destrée Brothers: The Neo-Catholic Movement and Socialist Movement", in Some Modern Belgian Writers: A Critical Study, New York, Robert M. McBride & Co., 1917, pp. 129–149.
 Idesbald Van Houtryve, " Destrée (Georges of Olivier-Georges) ", in Biographie Nationale de Belgique, vol. XXXIII, Brussels, Établissements Émile Bruylant, 1965, col. 247-251.

External links 
 catalogue.bnf.fr

1867 births
1919 deaths
Belgian Benedictines
Free University of Brussels (1834–1969) alumni
19th-century Belgian poets
19th-century Belgian male writers
20th-century Belgian Roman Catholic priests
Belgian male poets